Florence Margaret "Peggy" Pope (May 15, 1929 – May 27, 2020) was an American actress of stage, television and film.

Early life
Pope was born in Montclair, New Jersey. Her father was a notable doctor in the area. She graduated from Smith College.

Television
Pope made many acting appearances, including in such series as The Trials of O'Brien, Bewitched, and Barney Miller. Her national professional debut came in a touring troupe of Mister Roberts.

Film
Pope is likely best-remembered, if not by name, as "the office lush", and later, recovering alcoholic, Margaret Foster, in the 1980 movie 9 to 5. She also had a small role as Elvira in the 1984 science fiction movie The Last Starfighter. A year later, she appeared in Once Bitten as Mark Kendall's mother. In 2008, she appeared as Sister Angela in Clark Gregg's Choke.

Stage
Pope's Broadway credits include Doctor Jazz (1975), The School for Wives (1971), Harvey (1970), The Rose Tattoo (1966), Viva Madison Avenue! (1960), The Long Dream (1960), and Moonbirds (1959).

She appeared in the rotating cast of the Off-Broadway staged reading of Wit & Wisdom.

Awards
Pope won an Obie Award for Best Actress in 1968 for her performance in Muzeeka. She guest starred on numerous television series, including Bewitched, Hart to Hart, Eight Is Enough, Barney Miller (in 6 episodes), Soap, The Golden Girls, Hope & Faith and Law & Order.

Personal life
Pope was married once; the union ended in divorce.

At one time, when Pope was unable to find steady acting work, she and fellow actress Renée Taylor began a furniture business, refinishing and selling items that they found along sidewalks.

Upon her death, she was cremated at the Northern Colorado Crematory in Greeley, Colorado; her ashes were later scattered.

References

External links
 

1929 births
2020 deaths
American film actresses
People from Montclair, New Jersey
Actresses from New Jersey
American stage actresses
American television actresses
20th-century American actresses
21st-century American actresses
Smith College alumni